Alonzo Loqwone Mitz (born June 5, 1963) is an American former college and professional football player who was a defensive end in the National Football League (NFL) for seven seasons during the 1980s and early 1990s.  Mitz played college football for the University of Florida, and thereafter, played professionally for the Seattle Seahawks and the Cincinnati Bengals of the NFL.

Early years 

Mitz was born in Henderson, North Carolina in 1963.  He attended Fort Pierce Central High School in Fort Pierce, Florida, and played high school football for the Fort Pierce Central Cobras.

College career 

Mitz attended the University of Florida in Gainesville, Florida, where he played for coach Charley Pell and coach Galen Hall's Florida Gators football teams from 1982 to 1985.

Professional career 

During his six-season NFL career, he played in seventy-one games, started thirty-four of them, and compiled eight quarterback sacks and two interceptions.

See also 

 Florida Gators football, 1980–89
 History of the Cincinnati Bengals
 List of Florida Gators in the NFL Draft
 List of Seattle Seahawks players

References

Bibliography 

 Carlson, Norm, University of Florida Football Vault: The History of the Florida Gators, Whitman Publishing, LLC, Atlanta, Georgia (2007).  .
 Golenbock, Peter, Go Gators!  An Oral History of Florida's Pursuit of Gridiron Glory, Legends Publishing, LLC, St. Petersburg, Florida (2002).  .
 Hairston, Jack, Tales from the Gator Swamp: A Collection of the Greatest Gator Stories Ever Told, Sports Publishing, LLC, Champaign, Illinois (2002).  .
 McCarthy, Kevin M.,  Fightin' Gators: A History of University of Florida Football, Arcadia Publishing, Mount Pleasant, South Carolina (2000).  .
 Nash, Noel, ed., The Gainesville Sun Presents The Greatest Moments in Florida Gators Football, Sports Publishing, Inc., Champaign, Illinois (1998).  .

1963 births
Living people
People from Henderson, North Carolina
People from Fort Pierce, Florida
Players of American football from North Carolina
American football defensive ends
American football linebackers
Florida Gators football players
Seattle Seahawks players
Cincinnati Bengals players